Prenj is a mountain range in the Dinaric Alps of southern Bosnia and Herzegovina, located in eastern Herzegovina near Mostar, Jablanica and Konjic. Prenj massif has at least 11 peaks over 2000 m.

Geography 
The name Prenj is derived from Perun, supreme deity of Slavic mythology. Geologically, the Prenj range is part of the Dinaric Alps and formed largely of secondary and tertiary sedimentary rock, mostly limestone and dolomite with notable characteristics of a karst landform. Due to subterranean drainage, Prenj is relatively dry with few water sources, just a few tiny lakes and some smaller streams that source from these mountains: the Baščica and the Bijela, tributaries of the Neretva.

Notable peaks are Zelena Glava (2115 m), Lupoglav (2102 m), Otiš (2097 m), Herač (2046 m), Osobac (2030 m) and Velika Kapa (2007 m).

History 
The Prenj mountains were part of the front line during the 1992–95 war in Bosnia and heavy combat took place in the mountains surrounding the eastern Bijela valley and the slopes above Konjic. Nowadays, Prenj falls almost entirely within the territory of the Federation of Bosnia and Herzegovina. Contamination with land mines and unexploded ordnance is a serious threat, especially east of a line that can be drawn from Čelebići to the summit of Zelena Glava and then to the village of Ravni. Former combat positions can be found as high up as the shoulders of Otiš at around 2000 meters. Nevertheless, Prenj is a very attractive destination for climbers and hikers. The peaks bear typical dolomitic features with vertical rock faces, soaring over green alpine valleys and dense mixed forests. Some mountain huts have re-opened (Bijele Vode, Hrasnica) and marked itineraries to the main peaks have been re-established.

One of the peaks of Prenj, Windy Peak, was climbed for the first time in October 2003. It was probably one of Europe's last virgin 2000m peaks.

See also
Perun

References

External links
 Prenj at SummitPost.org
 Listing of mountain huts at www.behremplaninar.com 

Mountains of Bosnia and Herzegovina
Two-thousanders of Bosnia and Herzegovina